IKONOS was a commercial Earth observation satellite, and was the first to collect publicly available high-resolution imagery at 1- and 4-meter resolution. It collected multispectral (MS) and  panchromatic (PAN) imagery. The capability to observe Earth via space-based telescope has been called "one of the most significant developments in the history of the space age", and IKONOS brought imagery rivaling that of military spy satellites to the commercial market. IKONOS imagery began being sold on 1 January 2000, and the spacecraft was retired in 2015.

History

IKONOS originated under the Lockheed Corporation as the Commercial Remote Sensing System (CRSS) satellite. In April 1994 Lockheed was granted one of the first licenses from the U.S. Department of Commerce for commercial satellite high-resolution imagery. On 25 October 1995 partner company Space Imaging received a license from the Federal Communications Commission (FCC) to transmit telemetry from the satellite in the eight-gigahertz Earth Exploration Satellite Services band. Prior to launch, Space Imaging changed the name of the satellite system to IKONOS. The name comes from the Greek word eikōn, for "image".

Two satellites were originally planned for operation. IKONOS-1 was launched on 27 April 1999 at 18:22 UTC from Vandenberg AFB Space Launch Complex 6, but Athena II rocket's payload fairing did not separate due to an electrical malfunction, resulting in the satellite failing to reach orbit and falling into the atmosphere over the South Pacific Ocean.

IKONOS-2 was built in parallel with and as an identical twin to IKONOS-1. Completion of its construction was projected for July 1999 with a January 2000 launch. In reaction to the loss of IKONOS-1, the spacecraft was renamed IKONOS and its processing accelerated, resulting in a launch on 24 September 1999 at 18:22 UTC, also from Vandenberg aboard an Athena II rocket. The company began selling IKONOS imagery on the market on 1 January 2000.

In December 2000, IKONOS received the "Best of What's New" Grant Award in Aviation & Space from Popular Science magazine. The acquisition of Space Imaging and its assets by Orbimage was announced in September 2005 and finalized in January 2006. The merged company was renamed GeoEye, which was itself acquired by DigitalGlobe in January 2013.

DigitalGlobe operated IKONOS until its retirement on 31 March 2015.

Specifications

Spacecraft
IKONOS was a three-axis stabilized spacecraft designed by Lockheed Martin Space Systems. The design later became known as the LM-900 satellite bus and was optimized to carry remote sensing payloads. Four reaction wheels stabilized the spacecraft's altitude, which was measured by two star trackers and a sun sensor. Orbital position information was provided by a GPS receiver. Its design life was seven years.

Optical Sensor Assembly
IKONOS primary instrument was the Optical Sensor Assembly (OSA), designed and built by Kodak. The main mirror featured a honeycomb design to reduce mass. The detectors at the focal plane included a panchromatic sensor with 13,500 pixels cross-track, and four multispectral sensors (blue, green, red, and near-infrared) each with 3,375 pixels along-track.

See also

GeoEye-1

References

External links
 IKONOS data sheet by DigitalGlobe

Commercial imaging satellites of the United States
Lockheed Martin satellites and probes
Spacecraft launched in 1999
2015 disestablishments in the United States
Derelict satellites orbiting Earth